Katpalon or Kat Palon is a village in Phillaur tehsil of Jalandhar District of Punjab State, India. It is located 2 km from Nagar, 8 km from postal head office Phillaur, 51 km from Jalandhar and 118 km from state capital Chandigarh. The village is administrated by a sarpanch who is an elected representative of village as per Panchayati raj (India).

Caste 
The village has schedule caste (SC) constitutes 87.69% of total population of the village and it doesn't have any Schedule Tribe (ST) population.

Education 
The village has a Punjabi Medium, Co-educational primary school (Pri Katpalon School) founded in 1955. The schools provide mid-day meal as per Indian Midday Meal Scheme and the meal prepared in school premises.

Transport

Rail 
Phillaur Junction is the nearest train station, however, Bhatian Railway Station is 11 km away from the village.

Air 
The nearest domestic airport is located 40 km away in Ludhiana and the nearest international airport is located in Chandigarh also a second nearest international airport is 146 km away in Amritsar.

References 

Villages in Jalandhar district
Villages in Phillaur tehsil